Galin Minkov (Bulgarian: Галин Минков; born 2 November 1997) is a Bulgarian footballer who plays as a left back for CSKA Sofia.

Career
Minkov started his career in Litex Lovech. In 2016 he moved to CSKA Sofia. After spending several seasons on loan to Tsarsko Selo Sofia and Litex Lovech, he was recalled in the first team of CSKA Sofia by Saša Ilić. He completed his professional debut for the club on 14 August 2022 in a league match against Septemvri Sofia.

Career statistics

Club

References

External links
 

1997 births
Living people
Bulgarian footballers
Bulgaria youth international footballers
PFC Litex Lovech players
PFC Lokomotiv Mezdra players
FC Tsarsko Selo Sofia players
PFC CSKA Sofia players
First Professional Football League (Bulgaria) players
Association football midfielders